The 2010–11 Louisiana–Lafayette Ragin' Cajuns women's basketball team represented the University of Louisiana at Lafayette during the 2010–11 NCAA Division I women's basketball season. The Ragin' Cajuns were led by fourth-year head coach Errol Rogers; they played their double-header home games at the Cajundome with other games at the Earl K. Long Gymnasium, which is located on campus. They were members in the Sun Belt Conference. They finished the season 11–19, 4–12 in Sun Belt play to finish fifth place in the West Division. They were eliminated in the first round of the Sun Belt women's tournament.

Previous season 
The Ragin' Cajuns finished the 2009–10 season 10–22, 4–14 in Sun Belt play to finish in a three-way-tie for fifth place in the West Division. They made it to the 2010 Sun Belt Conference women's basketball tournament, losing in the first round game by a score of 76-82 to the South Alabama Jaguars. They were not invited to any other postseason tournament.

Roster

Schedule and results

|-
!colspan=6 style=| Non-conference regular season

|-
!colspan=6 style=| Sun Belt regular season

|-
!colspan=6 style=| Sun Belt Women's Tournament

See also
 2010–11 Louisiana–Lafayette Ragin' Cajuns men's basketball team

References

Louisiana Ragin' Cajuns women's basketball seasons
Louisiana-Lafayette
Louisiana
Louisiana